Werner Vetterli (28 July 1929 – 14 June 2008) was a Swiss modern pentathlete. He competed at the 1952 and 1960 Summer Olympics. In 1956, Vetterli began to work for Schweizer Radio DRS, in 1965 for Swiss television as a reporter, presenter and producer. Between 1969 and 1976, he was the Swiss presenter of the TV series Aktenzeichen XY… ungelöst.

References

External links
 

1929 births
2008 deaths
Swiss male modern pentathletes
Olympic modern pentathletes of Switzerland
Modern pentathletes at the 1952 Summer Olympics
Modern pentathletes at the 1960 Summer Olympics
People from Stäfa
Swiss television presenters
Sports commentators
Sportspeople from the canton of Zürich